Mariusz Jędra (born August 16, 1973 in Wrocław, Dolnośląskie) is a retired male weightlifter from Poland. He competed for his native country at the 2000 Summer Olympics in Sydney, Australia, finishing in ninth place in the men's heavyweight division (– 105 kg). Jędra is best known for winning the silver medal at the 1997 World Weightlifting Championships in the men's heavyweight class (– 108 kg).

References

External links
sports-reference

1973 births
Living people
Polish male weightlifters
Olympic weightlifters of Poland
Weightlifters at the 2000 Summer Olympics
Sportspeople from Wrocław
European Weightlifting Championships medalists
World Weightlifting Championships medalists